The Montevideo Open is a tennis tournament held in Montevideo, Uruguay since 2021. The event is part of the WTA 125 series and is played on outdoor clay courts.

Past finals

Singles

Doubles

See also
 Uruguay Open

References

External links

Clay court tennis tournaments
Tennis tournaments in Uruguay
Sport in Montevideo
Spring (season) events in Uruguay
WTA 125 tournaments